The 1982 Queen's Birthday Honours for Australia were appointments to recognise and reward good works by citizens of Australia and other nations that contribute to Australia. The Birthday Honours are awarded as part of the Queen's Official Birthday celebrations and were announced on 13 June 1982 in Australia.

The recipients of honours are displayed as they were styled before their new honour and arranged by honour with grades and then divisions i.e. Civil, Diplomatic and Military as appropriate.

Order of Australia

Knight of the Order of Australia (AK)

General Division

Companion (AC)

General Division

Officer (AO)

General Division

Military Division

Member (AM)

General Division

Military Division

References 

Birthday Honours
Award ceremonies in Australia
1982 in Australia
1982 awards
Orders, decorations, and medals of Australia